Audrey Vaillancourt (born 26 June 1991) is a Canadian former biathlete.

Career
She competed in the 2013/14 and 2014/15 World Cup seasons. She represented Canada at the Biathlon World Championships 2013 in Nové Město na Moravě, Czech Republic, and at the Biathlon World Championships 2015 in Kontiolahti, Finland.

References

External links 
 

1991 births
Living people
Canadian female biathletes